Douglas "Doug" Stuart Sheehan (born April 27, 1949) is an American actor who played Ben Gibson throughout four seasons of the prime-time drama Knots Landing from 1983 to 1987. His character was the second husband of Valene Ewing (Joan Van Ark).

His first major role was as Joe Kelly on the daytime soap opera General Hospital from 1979 to 1982.

He also played one of the leads in Day by Day as well as Mel Horowitz on Clueless from 1997 to 1999 replacing Michael Lerner. He also appeared on Sabrina the Teenage Witch as Sabrina's father.

Filmography

Film

Television

External links
 

1949 births
Living people
20th-century American male actors
21st-century American male actors
American male television actors
American male soap opera actors
Male actors from Santa Monica, California

References